Forwards (also known as attackers) are outfield positions in an association football team who play the furthest up the pitch and are therefore most responsible for scoring goals as well as assisting them. As with any attacking player, the role of the forward relies heavily on being able to create space for attack.

Attacking positions generally favour irrational players who ask questions to the defensive side of the opponent in order to create scoring chances, where they benefit from a lack of predictability in attacking play. Team formations normally include one to three forwards. For example, the common 4–2–3–1 includes one forward. Less conventional formations may include more than three forwards, or none.

Striker

The normal role of a striker is to score the majority of goals on behalf of the team. Tall and physical strikers with good heading ability may also be used to get onto the end of crosses, win long balls, or receive passes and retain possession of the ball with their backs to goal as teammates advance, in order to provide depth for their teams or help teammates score by providing passes ('through ball' into the box), the latter variation usually requiring quicker pace and good movement, in addition to finishing ability. Most modern strikers operate in front of the second strikers or central attacking midfielders, and do the majority of the ball handling outside the box. The term "target forward" is often used interchangeably with that of a striker, but usually describes a particular type of striker, who is usually a tall and physically strong player, who is adept at heading the ball; their main role is to win high balls in the air, hold up the ball, and create chances for other members of the team, in addition to possibly scoring many goals themselves. However, the two terms are not necessarily synonymous, with the target forward having developed into a more specialised role, while the centre-forward description is more broad, encompassing many types of forwards.

When numbers were introduced in the 1933 English FA Cup final, one of the two strikers that day wore the number 9 – Everton's Dixie Dean, a strong, powerful forward who had set the record for the most goals scored in a season in English football during the 1927–28 season. The number would then become synonymous with the centre-forward position (only worn that day because one team was numbered 1–11 whilst the other was numbered 12–22).

Centre-forward

Centre-forwards have a long history in the game, but the terminology to describe their playing activity has varied over the years. Originally such players were termed inside forwards, creative or deep-lying centre-forwards ("sub forwards"). More recently, two more variations of this old type of player have developed: the second, or shadow, or support, or auxiliary striker and, in what is in fact a distinct position unto its own, the number 10; the former role is exemplified by players such as Dennis Bergkamp (who would play just behind the striker Thierry Henry at Arsenal), Alessandro Del Piero at Juventus, Youri Djorkaeff at Inter Milan, or Teddy Sheringham at Tottenham Hotspur. Other creative players who play further back, such as Diego Maradona, Ronaldinho, Kaká, Michael Laudrup and Zinedine Zidane are often instead described as the "number 10", and usually operate as an attacking midfielder or advanced playmaker.

A centre forward should have good ball control abilities in order to receive the ball and keep it under control, so as to be able to finish off the attack or create a solid scoring chance. They also need to have good split-vision in order to know where to position themselves for a finish or a scoring chance. Finally, a solid set of finishing skills with the head as well as feet is an advantage, as this will lead to a good scoring percentage on attempts on goal.

The centre-forward position is a loosely defined and most often misunderstood description of a player positioned in a free role, somewhere between the out-and-out striker, whether the player is a "target man" or more of a "poacher", and the number 10 or attacking midfielder, while possibly showing some of the characteristics of both. In fact, a term coined by French advanced playmaker Michel Platini, the "nine-and-a-half", which he used to describe the playing role of his successor in the number 10 role at Juventus, Italian playmaker Roberto Baggio, has been an attempt to become a standard in defining the position. Conceivably, a number 10 can alternate as a centre-forward provided that the player is also a prolific goalscorer; otherwise, a mobile forward with good technical ability (dribbling skills and ball control), acceleration, vision, passing, and link-up play, who can both score and create opportunities for a less versatile centre-forward, is more suited. Although they are often given "licence to roam", and either run forward, or drop further back in order to pick up the ball in deeper areas, giving them more time and space in possession, second or support strikers do not tend to get as involved in the orchestration of attacks as the number 10, nor do they bring as many other players into play, since they do not share the burden of responsibility, functioning predominantly in a supporting role as assist providers. In Italy, this role is known as a "rifinitore", "mezzapunta", or "seconda punta", whereas in Brazil, it is known as "segundo atacante" or "ponta-de-lança".

Inside forward

The position of inside forward was popularly used in the late nineteenth and first half of the twentieth centuries. The inside forwards would support the centre-forward, running and making space in the opposition defence, and, as the passing game developed, supporting him with passes. The role is broadly analogous to the "hole" or second striker position in the modern game, although here, there were two such players, known as inside right and inside left.

In early 2–3–5 formations the inside-forwards would flank the centre-forward on both sides. With the rise of the WM formation, the inside forwards were brought back to become attacking midfielders, supplying balls to the centre-forward and the two attacking outside forwards – known as the outside right and outside left. In Italian football jargon, the inside forward was initially occasionally known as a mezzala (literally "half-winger", not to be confused with wing-half); however, the use of this particular term to describe inside forwards is now obsolete, as the mezzala label was later reapplied to describe the role of offensive-minded central midfielders in Italian football, while the inside forward role was instead labelled as "interno" ("internal", in Italian) in Italian football in subsequent years.

In today's game, inside forwards have been pushed up front to become either out-and-out attackers or false-9s, or out wide to wingers (in a 4–3–3 formation), or they have even been switched to a deeper position in which they are required to drop back to link-up with the midfield, while also supporting another striker playing alongside them up front (in a 4–4–2 formation). Many teams still employ one of their strikers in this latter more withdrawn role as a support forward for the main striker, in a role broadly similar to the inside forward.

Outside forward

An outside forward plays as the advanced forward on the right or left wing – as an outside right or outside left, typically as part of a 2–3–5 formation or one of its variants. As football tactics have largely developed, and wingers have dropped back to become midfielders, the terminology has changed and "outside forward" has become a historical term. Many commentators and football analysts still refer to the wing positions as "outside right" and "outside left". Such players in the modern era have been labelled "wing forwards", particularly when the two wingers play high up the pitch in a 4–3–3 or similar formation, where the front 3 attacking players have 3 central midfielders behind them. A wing forward who is known for cutting inside and shooting can have the term "inverted winger" used interchangeably.

The responsibilities of an outside forward include but are not limited to:
 Scoring: their first option should be to shoot, while their second option should be to find another way to create a goal opportunity for the team.
 Passing: when they run into a shooting angle that is unlikely to become a goal, they must find a way to pass the ball to the middle of the penalty box area allowing the centre-forwards to finish the job.

Due to these responsibilities some of the most important attributes include:
 Good dribbling and circumventing defenders
 Speed as a necessity to produce effective counter-attacks

Winger

A winger is an offensive player located in a wide position near the touchlines. They can be classified as forwards, considering their origin as the old "outside-forward" position, and continue to be termed as such in most parts of the world, especially in Latin and Dutch football cultures. However, in the British game (in which the 4–4–2 formation and its variants are most commonly used) they are usually counted as part of the midfield.

It is a winger's duty to beat opposing full-backs, deliver cut-backs or crosses from wide positions and, to a lesser extent, to beat defenders and score from close range. They are usually some of the quickest players in the team and usually have good dribbling skills as well. In Dutch, Spanish and Portuguese usage, the defensive duties of the winger have been usually confined to pressing the opposition fullbacks when they have the ball. Otherwise, a winger will drop closer to the midfield to make themself available, should their team win back the ball.

In British and other northern European styles of football, the wide-midfielder is expected to track back all the way to their own corner flag should their full-back require help, and also to track back their marker, as well as tucking into the midfield when the more central players are trying to pressure the opposition for the ball. This is a large responsibility for attack-orientated players, and particularly those like Joaquín (winger/wide midfielder), or Ryan Giggs (winger/striker), and John Barnes (winger/central midfielder), who lack the physical attributes of a wing-back or of a more orthodox midfield player. As these players grow older and lose their natural pace, they are frequently redeployed as "number 10s" between the midfield and the forward line, where their well-honed ball control, technical skills, ability to create chances, and improved reading of the game in the final third can serve to improve their teams' attacking options in tight spaces. An example is Inter Milan's use of veteran Luís Figo behind one or two other attackers, either as a second striker or in a playmaking role as an attacking midfielder.

In recent years there has been a trend of playing inverted wingers – wide players stationed on the 'wrong' side of the pitch, in order to enable them to cut inside and shoot on their stronger foot and sometimes provide in-swinging crosses. This tactic was used by Frank Rijkaard, who, whilst at Barcelona, moved Lionel Messi from the left flank onto the right wing, initially against the player's wishes. This allowed him to cut into the centre and shoot or cross with his left foot. Another example of a successful inverted winger partnership was Bayern Munich's pairing of the left-footed Arjen Robben alongside the right-footed Franck Ribéry, on the right and left flanks respectively.

A description that has been used in the media to label a variation upon the inverted winger position is that of an "attacking", "false", or "goalscoring winger", as exemplified by Cristiano Ronaldo and Gareth Bale's roles on the left and right flank during their time at Real Madrid in particular. This label has been used to describe an offensive-minded inverted winger, who will seemingly operate out wide on paper, but who instead will be given the freedom to make unmarked runs into more advanced central areas inside the penalty area, in order to get on the end of passes and crosses and score goals, effectively functioning as a striker. This role is somewhat comparable to what is known as the raumdeuter role in German football jargon (literally "space interpreter"), as exemplified by Thomas Müller, namely an attacking-minded wide player, who will move into central areas in order to find spaces from which he can receive passes and score or assist goals.

The "false winger" or "seven-and-a-half" is instead a label which has been used to describe a type of player who normally plays centrally, but who instead is deployed out wide on paper; during the course of a match, however, they will move inside and operate in the centre of the pitch, in order to drag defenders out of position, congest the midfield and give their team a numerical advantage in this area, so that they can dominate possession in the middle of the pitch and create chances for the forwards; this position also leaves space for full-backs to make overlapping attacking runs up the flank. Samir Nasri, who has been deployed in this role, once described it as that of a "non-axial playmaker".

On occasion, the role of an offensive winger can also be occupied by a different type of player. For example, certain managers have been known to use a "wide target man" on the wing, namely a large and physical player who usually plays as a centre-forward, and who will attempt to win aerial challenges and hold up the ball on the flank, or drag full-backs out of position. Jostein Flo epitomizes this role so much so that a tactic was named after him – Flo Pass. Egil Olsen, while managing the Norway national football team, positioned Flo, usually a centre-forward, on the right flank to exploit the opposition full-backs' lack of aerial abilities. Another example is Mario Mandžukić, a natural centre-forward, who was used on the left flank under manager Massimiliano Allegri at Juventus during the 2016–17 season, as well as the following season. Unlike wide target men of earlier eras, Mandžukić was also tasked with pressing opposing players. Romelu Lukaku has also been used in this role on occasion.

False 9

A False 9, in some ways similar to a more advanced attacking midfielder/playmaker role, is an unconventional lone striker or centre-forward, who drops deep into midfield. The purpose of this is that it creates a problem for opposing centre-backs who can either follow the false 9, leaving space behind them for onrushing midfielders, forwards or wingers to exploit, or leaving the false 9 to have time and space to dribble or pick out a pass. The term comes from the traditional number for centre-forwards (nine), and the fact that normally a centre-forward traditionally stayed near the line of defenders until they got an opportunity to move past them toward goal. Key attributes for a false 9 are similar to those of a deep-lying striker: dribbling ability to take advantage of space between the lines, good short passing ability to link up with the midfield and vision to play through teammates making runs from deep to goal.

The first false 9 in a World Cup was Juan Peregrino Anselmo in the Uruguay national team, although he could not play the match against Argentina in the 1930 World Cup due to injury. Matthias Sindelar was the false 9 of the Wunderteam, the Austria national team, in 1934. In South America, in 1941, River Plate's La Máquina team started using the left winger Adolfo Pedernera as a man of reference. When Pedernera transferred to Atlanta, a young Alfredo Di Stéfano took his place. A false 9 was also utilized by Hungary at the beginning of the 1950s, with striker Nándor Hidegkuti acting in the role as a deep-lying centre forward. In 1953, English football was astounded by the Hungarian team which beat England 6–3 at Wembley Stadium. The Revie Plan was a variation on the tactics used by the Hungarians, involving Don Revie playing as a deep-lying centre-forward. Revie started attacks by coming into the centre of the field to receive the ball, drawing the opposing centre-half out of position. The role can also be compared to the false role in which Hidegkuti operated. The system was first implemented by the Manchester City reserve team, who using the system went unbeaten for the last 26 games of the 1953–54 season. Before the start of the 1954–55 season, Manchester City manager Les McDowall called his team into pre-season training two weeks early to try the new tactic. Manchester City lost their first game using the system 5–0, but as the players became more used to the system it started to become more successful. Using the system Manchester City reached the 1955 FA Cup Final, but lost to Newcastle United 3–1. The following year City again reached the final where they played Birmingham City, this time winning 3–1.

Throughout his career, Johan Cruyff was often deployed in a free role as a centre-forward with Ajax, Barcelona, and the Netherlands in the 1970s in Rinus Michels's fluid 1–3–3–3 formation, which was a key and trademark feature of the manager's total football system; although Cruyff was a prolific goalscorer in this position, he also frequently dropped deep to confuse his markers and orchestrate attacks, or moved out onto the wing in order to create space for other teammates' runs, which has led certain pundits to compare this role retroactively as a precursor to the modern false 9 role.

Michael Laudrup was occasionally used as a lone centre-forward in Johan Cruyff's Barcelona Dream Team, a role which was similar to that of the modern false 9 role.

Roma under manager Luciano Spalletti used Francesco Totti, nominally an attacking midfielder or trequartista, up-front in an innovative "4–6–0" formation in the mid-2000s; this was met with a run of 11 consecutive victories.

At Euro 2012, Spain manager Vicente del Bosque, although sometimes deploying Fernando Torres as a traditional striker, often used Cesc Fàbregas as a false 9 in several matches, including the final. By the end of 2012, the False 9 had gone "mainstream" with many clubs employing a version of the system. Barcelona's Lionel Messi has been an epitome of the false 9 position to much success in recent years, first under coach Pep Guardiola and later under his successor Tito Vilanova. Brazilian forward Roberto Firmino was later also successfully used in the false 9 position under manager Jürgen Klopp at Liverpool.

One approach to stop false 9s has been to create congestion in the midfield by bringing several players back into a more defensive role in an attempt to deny them space needed to create plays, notably in José Mourinho's "parking the bus" strategy.

In Italian football jargon, this role is historically known as the "centravanti di manovra" (which literally translates to "manoeuvring centre-forward").

Target forward

The term "target forward" or "target man" is often used to describe a particular type of striker or centre-forward whose main role is to win high balls in the air, hold up the ball, and create chances for other members of the team in addition to scoring goals themselves. These players are usually tall and physically strong, adept at heading the ball, and capable of playing with their back to goal in the final third of the pitch. Some of the most high-profile examples of this type of players in modern football include Olivier Giroud and Fernando Llorente, both World Cup winners, with the former having played the entire tournament as a starting line-up forward tasked primarily with pressing, counter-pressing, winning high or loose balls, and providing key passes to quicker and more agile teammates, namely Antoine Griezmann or Kylian Mbappé. Another example of a striker who played in this position is Didier Drogba. However, not any tall and/or physically strong player feels comfortable in the role of a "target man", despite having all the necessary features. Such forwards as Zlatan Ibrahimović, Romelu Lukaku, and Erling Haaland have all rejected the term when applied to specifically them, with Ibrahimović preferring to be described as an attacking all-rounder, while Lukaku and Haaland have said to favor poaching goals rather than physical play.

Striker combinations

Strike teams consist of two or more strikers who work together. The history of football has been filled with many effective combinations. Three-man teams often operate in "triangles", giving a wealth of attacking options. Four-man packages expand options even more. Strikers must also be flexible, and be able to switch roles at a moment's notice, between the first (advanced penetrator position), second (deep-lying manoeuvre) and third (support and expansion, e.g. wings) attacker roles.

Another example was the Total Football played by the Dutch team in the 1970s, where the ability of their players, and in particular Johan Cruyff, to swap positions allowed a flexible attacking approach which opposition teams found difficult to effectively mark.

In a two-player front line, it is common for two forwards who complement one another to be paired together; for example, former Italy manager Cesare Maldini often used a large, physical, and prolific player as a traditional centre-forward – such as Christian Vieri – alongside a smaller, faster, creative and more technical player as a second striker – such as Roberto Baggio or Alessandro Del Piero.

Another similar example of an effective partnership at international level was that of Alex Morgan and Abby Wambach with the United States national team, who scored a combined 55 goals in 2012, matching a 21-year-old record set in 1991 by Michelle Akers (39 goals) and Carin Jennings (16 goals) as the most goals scored by any duo in U.S. WNT history.

One of the most prolific forward combinations in the history of the game was the front three of Barcelona, Lionel Messi, Luis Suárez and Neymar, dubbed MSN. On average they scored a goal every 45 minutes – two goals per game from the three forwards. The trio scored a record-breaking 131 goals in one season for Barcelona during 2015–16. In 2017, Kylian Mbappé, Neymar, and Edinson Cavani scored a record-breaking number of goals for Paris Saint-Germain in the Champions League group stage. The next year, the Liverpool attacking quartet of Roberto Firmino, Mohamed Salah, Sadio Mané and Philippe Coutinho, dubbed the "Fab Four" (in reference to The Beatles), contributed to a record-breaking 47 goals for a single Champions League season.

See also

Association football positions
Association football tactics
Defender (association football)
Goalkeeper (association football)
Midfielder (association football)

References

 
Association football positions
Association football terminology
Association football player non-biographical articles